William Dow (March 27, 1800 – December 7, 1868) was a Scottish-born brewer and financier of Montreal, Quebec, Canada.

Born at Muthill, Perthshire, he was the eldest son of Dr William Dow (1765-1844), Brewmaster, and Anne Mason. Since 1652, his family had been brewing in Perthshire. Having gained an extensive experience in brewing under his father, he emigrated to Montreal, Lower Canada from Scotland in about 1818. He was employed as foreman of Thomas Dunn's brewery in Montreal and quickly became a partner. His younger brother, Andrew, who had also trained as a brewer, joined him, and on the death of Dunn, the company became known as William Dow and Company, later known as Dow Breweries. It soon was a strong competitor to Molson's, the biggest brewery in the city. Dow was also a financier and in 1860 he built his home, Strathearn House, in Montreal's Golden Square Mile.

External links 
 Biography at the Dictionary of Canadian Biography Online
 William Dow House, Montreal
 Business and History - Dow Brewery Limited 

Anglophone Quebec people
Businesspeople from Montreal
Canadian financiers
People from Perthshire
People in food and agriculture occupations
Scottish emigrants to pre-Confederation Quebec
Scottish emigrants to the United States
1800 births
1868 deaths
Immigrants to Lower Canada
Brewery workers
Burials at Mount Royal Cemetery